Contractor rating systems, also known as contractor prequalifications, are one of the larger cost-saving practices available and more routinely applied by governmental organizations as a means of avoiding the high cost and inflated pricing that results from reduced competition on public work by using bonding and surety to guarantee performance of public work.

Years ago public purchasing officials began applying prequalification and short-listing of pre-selected contractors for bidding on public procurement contracts. A subjective process is in many places the exclusive means of getting on a bidders list for public contract work.

These ratings and processes now make the whole issue of bonding and surety, (that has been around since the late 19th century to guarantee of performance and paying large premiums), obsolete and redundant since the public officials have already reduced risks and are paying premiums associated with reducing competition by using the prequalification process and rating systems.

Construction